Garcinia acuminata is an obsolete binomial that previously referred to what are now two separate species:

Garcinia elliptica, endemic to South-East Asia
Garcinia madruno, the charichuelo, endemic to the neo-tropics from Honduras to Paraguay